The 1971 International Cross Country Championships was held in San Sebastián, Spain, at the Lasarte Hippodrome on 20 March 1971. A report on the event was given in the Glasgow Herald.

Complete results for men, junior men,  women, medallists, 
 and the results of British athletes were published.

Medallists

Individual Race Results

Men's (7.5 mi / 12.1 km)

Junior Men's (4.35 mi / 7.0 km)

Women's (2.8 mi / 4.5 km)

Team Results

Men's

Junior Men's

Women's

Participation
An unofficial count yields the participation of 228 athletes from 18 countries.

 (11)
 (18)
 (20)
 (8)
 (14)
 (19)
 (19)
 (12)
 (5)
 (14)
 (11)
 (7)
 (4)
 (20)
 (20)
 (7)
 (6)
 (13)

See also
 1971 in athletics (track and field)

References

International Cross Country Championships
International Cross Country Championships
Cross
International Cross Country Championships
Sport in San Sebastián
Cross country running in Spain